Jathedar Prahlad Singh (d. 1865) was a Nihang Sikh and 8th Jathedar of Shiromani Panth Akali Budha Dal.

Life
He became Jathedar of Budha Dal in 1846 and also became Jathedar of Akal Takhat on the same day. He fought in the first and second Anglo-Sikh Wars against the British and raided cantonments outside of the area in 1850 alongside Bhai Maharaj Singh.

Afterwards in 1858 he sent Mith Jathedar Nihang Faqir Singh to Ayodhya as Hindus pleaded to liberate the Babri Masjid which he did. Afterwards from 1858 he had good relations with the British until 1865 during the Akal Takht elections where the Patiala State forcefully appointed Arur Singh Naushera and supported the Nirmalas, which was when he led multiple small scale revolts against the Patiala State by Nihangs, who populated about 300 at the time.

When the Nihang Singhs moved out of Punjab after fighting with Patiala State Ruler and the British, they started moving towards Nanded. Ala Singh who was under the Patiala State after a series of battles was a Hazur Sahib Pujari (priest) and attacked Prahlad Singh with a battalion of the Royal Maharaja's Patiala State Armed Forces. Prahlad Singh attained martyrdom while fighting with Major Ala Singh of Hazoor Sahib and Ala Singh was also killed in the same battle, although the Nihangs won in the end.

References

Nihang
Punjabi people
Jathedars of Akal Takht
19th-century Indian people